The Unipart British Professional Championship  was a darts tournament organised by the British Darts Organisation and televised by the BBC between 1981 and 1988. After the 1988 championships, the BBC withdrew their coverage of the event and it left UK terrestrial television with only one televised tournament – the World Championships. The game was at an all-time low and players eventually went on to set up the World Darts Council in an attempt to bring back sponsors and television.

Jocky Wilson won the title a record four times – John Lowe also reached four finals but lost them all.

British Professional Championship finals

References

External links
 Dartsdatabase British Professional Championship winners
 Mastercaller British Professional

1981 establishments in the United Kingdom
1988 disestablishments in the United Kingdom
British Darts Organisation tournaments
Darts tournaments
National championships in the United Kingdom
Darts in the United Kingdom